Davis George Croghan, D.D. (July 10, 1832 in Ireland – November 21, 1890 in South Africa), the first Archdeacon of Bloemfontein, and Provost of the Cathedral.

Dr. Croghan was a graduate of Trinity College, Dublin. He arrived in Bloemfontein on 28 February 1867, but left on 6 March 1887, in part because of the relatively harsh winters in the Orange Free State, and became Dean of Grahamstown.

References

1832 births
1890 deaths
Archdeacons of Bloemfontein
Deans of Bloemfontein
Deans of Grahamstown
19th-century South African Anglican priests